The Sacramento Express were a professional American rugby union team that played in the short lived PRO Rugby competition. They were based in Sacramento, California, and played their home games at Bonney Field.

History
In early November 2015, PRO Rugby launched its Facebook page and scheduled an announcement for November 9, 2015.
On November 9, 2015, PRO Rugby made an official announcement outlining its plans and a framework for the competition.  USA Rugby affirmed that it sanctioned and supported the PRO Rugby competition.
PRO Rugby announced its first team, Sacramento, on November 18, 2015.

In February 2016, Luke Gross was announced as the head coach of the new Sacramento PRO Rugby team.

The league reportedly had begun extending contract offers to select players by mid-February. In early March, the league made its first official announcement regarding player signings when it announced that Italian international Mirco Bergamasco would be joining the Sacramento team. Sacramento and other teams started convening their players in mid-March 2016 to begin training.

On December 20, 2016, all PRO Rugby players received notice their contracts will be terminated in 30 days if progress is not made towards resolving disputes between the league and USA Rugby.

Venue

Current players and staff

Roster

The squad for the 2016 PRO Rugby season:

Coaching staff

Season summaries

Leading players

Coaches

References

Rugby clubs established in 2016
Express
2016 establishments in California
2017 disestablishments in California
Rugby union clubs disestablished in 2017
PRO Rugby teams